Fulton is a neighborhood in the Southwest community in Minneapolis. Its boundaries are West 47th Street to the north, Penn Avenue South to the east, West 54th Street to the south, and France Avenue South to the west. Nearby neighborhoods include Linden Hills to the north, Lynnhurst to the east, and Armatage to the south. The suburb of Edina lies to the south and west. West 50th Street is a major east–west thoroughfare bisecting the neighborhood. At its intersection with France Avenue is the upscale 50th & France commercial district, which lies along the border between Minneapolis and Edina.

In 2017 Fulton saw the killing of Justine Damond, in which a 40 year old Australian woman was shot and killed by police officer Mohamed Noor after calling 9-1-1 to report a possible assault behind her home.

Businesses 
Businesses in Fulton Neighborhood, Minneapolis

References

External links
Minneapolis Neighborhood Profile - Fulton
Fulton Neighborhood Association

Neighborhoods in Minneapolis